Stenalia abyssinica is a beetle in the genus Stenalia of the family Mordellidae. It was described in 1957.

References

abyssinica
Beetles described in 1957